Eliseo Noel Mejía Castillo (born 17 February 1948 in Colón) is a Honduran politician. He currently serves as deputy of the National Congress of Honduras representing the National Party of Honduras for Cortés.

References

1948 births
Living people
Deputies of the National Congress of Honduras
National Party of Honduras politicians
People from Cortés Department